The Sorrell SNS-7 Hiperbipe is a two-seat, negative stagger, conventional landing gear-equipped cabin biplane designed for amateur construction that was produced in kit form by Sorrell Aviation of Tenino, Washington and since 2015 by Thunderbird Aviation.

Design and development
The SNS-7 (Sorrell Negative Stagger, Model 7) was intended to give full unlimited aerobatic performance without sacrificing the comforts of a cabin-style aircraft.

The Sorrell family originated from the state of Oregon, which was the last state to ban homebuilt aircraft. Hobie Sorrell petitioned congress for experimental aircraft regulations, and his son Tim designed the Hiperbipe in a series of family designed homebuilt aircraft. The design is of mixed construction. The fuselage, tail, engine mount, landing gear mounts, interplane struts and flight controls are all built from welded 4130 steel. The wings are made from wood, with wooden stressed skin. The landing gear is sprung steel tube. The engine cowling and wheel pants are fibreglass. The whole airframe is covered in doped aircraft fabric, including the plywood-covered wings. The airfoil is a custom symmetrical design.

The SNS-7 is capable of advanced aerobatics, including vertical eight point rolls and inside and outside vertical eights.

The tooling and manufacturing rights were acquired by Thunderbird Aviation in 2015, who began making parts and basic kits.

Operational history
In April 2010 there were 22 Hiperbipes registered in the United States, two in Canada, and one in the United Kingdom.

Specifications (SNS-7)

See also

References

External links

Photo of the sole UK Hiperbipe on Airliners.net

Biplanes with negative stagger
Homebuilt aircraft
Hiperbipe
Single-engined tractor aircraft
Aerobatic aircraft